The Silesian Insurgents' Monument in Katowice, southern Poland,  is a monument to those who took part in the three Silesian Uprisings of 1919, 1920 and 1921, which aimed to make the region of Upper Silesia part of the newly independent Polish state. The monument was unveiled on 1 September 1967, and was designed by sculptor Gustaw Zemła and architect Wojciech Zabłocki. The wings symbolize the three uprisings, and the names of places where battles were fought are etched on the vertical slopes. The monument was funded by the people of Warsaw for Upper Silesia.

Monuments and memorials in Poland
Buildings and structures completed in 1967
Buildings and structures in Katowice
Silesian culture
Silesian Uprisings
Tourist attractions in Katowice